The 1966 USC Trojans baseball team represented the University of Southern California in the 1966 NCAA University Division baseball season. The Trojans played their home games at Bovard Field. The team was coached by Rod Dedeaux in his 25th year at USC.

The Trojans won the California Intercollegiate Baseball Association championship and the District VIII Playoff to advance to the College World Series, where they were defeated by the Ohio State Buckeyes.

Roster

Schedule 

! style="" | Regular Season
|- valign="top" 

|- align="center" bgcolor="#ccffcc"
| 1 || February 11 ||  || Bovard Field • Los Angeles, California || 9–1 || 1–0 || 0–0
|- align="center" bgcolor="#ccffcc"
| 2 || February 19 ||  || Bovard Field • Los Angeles, California || 15–14 || 2–0 || 0–0
|- align="center" bgcolor="#ccffcc"
| 3 || February 19 || San Fernando Valley State || Bovard Field • Los Angeles, California || 10–5 || 3–0 || 0–0
|- align="center" bgcolor="#ccffcc"
| 4 || February 25 ||  || Bovard Field • Los Angeles, California || 14–10 || 4–0 || 0–0
|- align="center" bgcolor="#ffcccc"
| 5 || February 28 ||  || Bovard Field • Los Angeles, California || 14–10 || 4–1 || 0–0
|-

|- align="center" bgcolor="#ccffcc"
| 6 || March 1 || at San Fernando Valley State || Matador Field • Northridge, California || 6–2 || 5–1 || 0–0
|- align="center" bgcolor="#ccffcc"
| 7 || March 4 || at  || Campus Diamond • Santa Barbara, California || 7–3 || 6–1 || 1–0
|- align="center" bgcolor="#ccffcc"
| 8 || March 5 || Santa Barbara || Bovard Field • Los Angeles, California || 10–0 || 7–1 || 2–0
|- align="center" bgcolor="#ccffcc"
| 9 || March 7 || at Long Beach State || Blair Field • Long Beach, California || 2–0 || 8–1 || 2–0
|- align="center" bgcolor="#ccffcc"
| 10 || March 11 ||  || Bovard Field • Los Angeles, California || 4–3 || 9–1 || 3–0
|- align="center" bgcolor="#ccffcc"
| 11 || March 12 ||  || Bovard Field • Los Angeles, California || 6–0 || 10–1 || 4–0
|- align="center" bgcolor="#ccffcc"
| 12 || March 12 || California || Bovard Field • Los Angeles, California || 6–0 || 11–1 || 5–0
|- align="center" bgcolor="#ccffcc"
| 13 || March 15 ||  || Bovard Field • Los Angeles, California || 5–3 || 12–1 || 5–0
|- align="center" bgcolor="#ccffcc"
| 14 || March 18 || at California || Edwards Field • Berkeley, California || 4–2 || 13–1 || 6–0
|- align="center" bgcolor="#ccffcc"
| 15 || March 19 || at Santa Clara || Buck Shaw Stadium • Santa Clara, California || 9–6 || 14–1 || 7–0
|- align="center" bgcolor="#ccffcc"
| 16 || March 19 || at Santa Clara || Buck Shaw Stadium • Santa Clara, California || 3–2 || 15–1 || 8–0
|- align="center" bgcolor="#ccffcc"
| 17 || March 22 ||  || Bovard Field • Los Angeles, California || 13–0 || 16–1 || 8–0
|- align="center" bgcolor="#ccffcc"
| 18 || March 26 ||  || Bovard Field • Los Angeles, California || 3–1 || 17–1 || 9–0
|- align="center" bgcolor="#ffcccc"
| 19 || March 26 || Stanford || Bovard Field • Los Angeles, California || 0–4 || 17–2 || 9–1
|- align="center" bgcolor="#ccffcc"
| 20 || March 27 || Santa Clara || Bovard Field • Los Angeles, California || 7–3 || 18–2 || 10–1
|- align="center" bgcolor="#ccffcc"
| 21 || March 29 || at Cal State Los Angeles || Unknown • Los Angeles, California || 4–0 || 19–2 || 10–1
|-

|- align="center" bgcolor="#ccffcc"
| 22 || April 1 ||  || Bovard Field • Los Angeles, California || 14–3 || 20–2 || 10–1
|- align="center" bgcolor="#ccffcc"
| 23 || April 2 || Pepperdine || Bovard Field • Los Angeles, California || 6–0 || 21–2 || 10–1
|- align="center" bgcolor="#ccffcc"
| 24 || April 2 || Pepperdine || Bovard Field • Los Angeles, California || 11–0 || 22–2 || 10–1
|- align="center" bgcolor="#ccffcc"
| 25 || April 4 || vs  || Unknown • Unknown || 5–1 || 23–2 || 10–1
|- align="center" bgcolor="#ffcccc"
| 26 || April 5 || vs San Diego State || Unknown • Unknown || 1–3 || 23–3 || 10–1
|- align="center" bgcolor="#ccffcc"
| 27 || April 5 || vs  || Unknown • Unknown || 12–0 || 24–3 || 10–1
|- align="center" bgcolor="#ccffcc"
| 28 || April 6 || vs  || Unknown • Unknown || 12–7 || 25–3 || 11–1
|- align="center" bgcolor="#ccffcc"
| 29 || April 6 || vs San Diego State || Unknown • Unknown || 10–5 || 26–3 || 11–1
|- align="center" bgcolor="#ffcccc"
| 30 || April 12 ||  || Bovard Field • Los Angeles, California || 3–4 || 26–4 || 11–1
|- align="center" bgcolor="#ffcccc"
| 31 || April 15 || at California || Edwards Field • Berkeley, California || 2–7 || 26–5 || 11–2
|- align="center" bgcolor="#ffcccc"
| 32 || April 16 || at Stanford || Sunken Diamond • Stanford, California || 3–5 || 26–6 || 11–3
|- align="center" bgcolor="#ccffcc"
| 33 || April 16 || at Stanford || Sunken Diamond • Stanford, California || 3–2 || 27–6 || 12–3
|- align="center" bgcolor="#ccffcc"
| 34 || April 19 ||  || Bovard Field • Los Angeles, California || 3–0 || 28–6 || 12–3
|- align="center" bgcolor="#ccffcc"
| 35 || April 22 ||  || Bovard Field • Los Angeles, California || 4–2 || 29–6 || 12–3
|- align="center" bgcolor="#ffcccc"
| 36 || April 26 || at Santa Barbara || Campus Diamond • Santa Barbara, California || 1–2 || 29–7 || 12–4
|- align="center" bgcolor="#ccffcc"
| 37 || April 29 ||  || Bovard Field • Los Angeles, California || 2–1 || 30–7 || 12–4
|-

|- align="center" bgcolor="#ccffcc"
| 38 || May 3 || Santa Barbara || Bovard Field • Los Angeles, California || 6–0 || 31–7 || 12–4
|- align="center" bgcolor="#ccffcc"
| 39 || May 6 || at  || Sawtelle Field • Los Angeles, California || 13–10 || 32–7 || 13–4
|- align="center" bgcolor="#ccffcc"
| 40 || May 7 || UCLA || Bovard Field • Los Angeles, California || 3–2 || 33–7 || 14–4
|- align="center" bgcolor="#ccffcc"
| 41 || May 10 || at Cal Poly Pomona || Unknown • Pomona, California || 7–1 || 34–7 || 14–4
|- align="center" bgcolor="#ccffcc"
| 42 || May 13 || UCLA || Bovard Field • Los Angeles, California || 13–11 || 35–7 || 15–4
|- align="center" bgcolor="#ccffcc"
| 43 || May 14 || at UCLA || Sawtelle Field • Los Angeles, California || 4–1 || 36–7 || 16–4
|-

|-
! style="" | Postseason
|- valign="top"

|- align="center" bgcolor="#ccffcc"
| 44 || May 23 || Cal Poly Pomona || Bovard Field • Los Angeles, California || 11–7 || 37–7 || 16–4
|- align="center" bgcolor="#ccffcc"
| 45 || May 24 ||  || Bovard Field • Los Angeles, California || 4–3 || 38–7 || 16–4
|- align="center" bgcolor="#ccffcc"
| 46 || May 25 || Washington State || Bovard Field • Los Angeles, California || 7–4 || 39–7 || 16–4
|-

|- align="center" bgcolor="#ccffcc"
| 47 || June 13 || vs North Carolina || Omaha Municipal Stadium • Omaha, Nebraska || 6–2 || 40–7 || 16–4
|- align="center" bgcolor="#ffcccc"
| 48 || June 14 || vs Ohio State || Omaha Municipal Stadium • Omaha, Nebraska || 2–6 || 40–8 || 16–4
|- align="center" bgcolor="#ccffcc"
| 49 || June 15 || vs Arizona || Omaha Municipal Stadium • Omaha, Nebraska || 8–4 || 41–8 || 16–4
|- align="center" bgcolor="#ccffcc"
| 50 || June 16 || vs Ohio State || Omaha Municipal Stadium • Omaha, Nebraska || 5–1 || 42–8 || 16–4
|- align="center" bgcolor="#ffcccc"
| 51 || June 17 || vs Ohio State || Omaha Municipal Stadium • Omaha, Nebraska || 0–1 || 42–9 || 16–4
|-

|

Awards and honors 
Shelly Andrens
 Honorable Mention All-CIBA

Oscar Brown
 Second Team All-American The Sports Network
 First Team All-CIBA

Armando DeCastro
 Honorable Mention All-CIBA

Justin Dedeaux
 Second Team All-CIBA

Pat Harrison
 Second Team All-CIBA

John Herbst
 Honorable Mention All-CIBA

Fred Shuey
 Second Team All-CIBA

Steve Sogge
 Second Team All-American The Sports Network
 First Team All-CIBA

John Stewart
 Second Team All-American American Baseball Coaches Association
 College World Series All-Tournament Team
 First Team All-CIBA

References 

USC Trojans baseball seasons
USC Trojans baseball
College World Series seasons
USC
Pac-12 Conference baseball champion seasons